Starmen Point (‘Nos Starmen’ \'nos 'st&r-men\) is the point on the west side of the entrance to Crates Bay on the northeast coast of Stresher Peninsula, Graham Coast on the Antarctic Peninsula.

The feature is named after the settlement of Starmen in Northeastern Bulgaria.

Location
British mapping in 1976.

Maps
 British Antarctic Territory.  Scale 1:200000 topographic map. DOS 610 Series, Sheet W 66 64.  Directorate of Overseas Surveys, Tolworth, UK, 1976.
 Antarctic Digital Database (ADD). Scale 1:250000 topographic map of Antarctica. Scientific Committee on Antarctic Research (SCAR). Since 1993, regularly upgraded and updated.

References
 Starmen Point. SCAR Composite Antarctic Gazetteer.
 Bulgarian Antarctic Gazetteer. Antarctic Place-names Commission. (details in Bulgarian, basic data in English)

External links
 Starmen Point. Copernix satellite image

Bulgaria and the Antarctic
Headlands of Graham Land
Graham Coast